Seung Sz Wan also transliterated as Seung Sz Wan is a village in Sai Kung District, New Territories, Hong Kong. It is located on the western shore of the Sheung Sze Wan bay.

Administration
Seung Sz Wan is a recognized village under the New Territories Small House Policy.

History
Sheung Sze Wan was part of the inter-village grouping, the Ho Chung Tung or Ho Chung Seven Villages, which had its centre in Ho Chung.

References

External links

 Delineation of area of existing village Sheung Sze Wan (Hang Hau) for election of resident representative (2019 to 2022)

 

Villages in Sai Kung District, Hong Kong
Clear Water Bay Peninsula